Glenea basilana is a species of beetle in the family Cerambycidae. It was described by Maurice Pic in 1943.

References

basilana
Beetles described in 1943